Der arme Heinrich is a German-language opera in three acts by Hans Pfitzner to a libretto by James Grun. The premiere was at the Mainz Municipal Theatre on 2 April 1895.

The opera is based on Hartmann von Aue's 12th-century narrative poem Der arme Heinrich.

Recordings
2002: Dortmunder Philharmoniker, Capriccio 2 CDs, C60087

References

External links
 

1895 operas
Operas
Operas by Hans Pfitzner
German-language operas
Operas set in the 11th century
Operas based on literature